Welcome to My Love is a 1968 studio album by Nancy Wilson, arranged and conducted by Oliver Nelson.

Stephen Cook at AllMusic says the album "offers a consistent selection of high-quality standards and strong contemporary material impressively set off by Oliver Nelson's soulfully urbane arrangements." Cook claims that "Wilson's smoky, whispered voice imparts just the right amount of tender drama here while Nelson's dark and restrained string charts keep things from getting syrupy," and he concludes by saying that Wilson "successfully straddled the jazz/soul divide and in the process produced one of her best albums of the 60's."

A 1970 reissue of the album was entitled For Once in My Life and did not include the track "It Never Entered My Mind." In 1994, Capitol released the album on compact disc with its original title and cover, along with an additional bonus track.

Track listing

Side 1 

"In the Heat of the Night" (Alan Bergman, Marilyn Bergman, Quincy Jones) - 2:32
"May I Come In?" (Marvin Fisher, Jack Segal) - 2:35
"Angel Eyes" (Earl Brent, Matt Dennis) - 2:48
"It Never Entered My Mind" (Richard Rodgers, Lorenz Hart) - 2:49
"I'm Always Drunk In San Francisco (and I Don't Drink at All)" (Tommy Wolf) - 2:29
"Theme From "Hotel"" (Johnny Keating, Robert Quine) - 2:36

Side 2 

"For Once in My Life" (Ron Miller, Orlando Murden) - 3:05
"You Don't Know Me" (Eddy Arnold, Cindy Walker) - 2:27 
"Why Try to Change Me Now?" (Cy Coleman, Joseph McCarthy) - 3:14
"Welcome to My Love" (Sammy Cahn, Bill Schluger) - 2:35
"Ode to Billie Joe" (Bobby Gentry) - 5:18

1994 CD Bonus Track
"Let's Make the Most of a Beautiful Thing" - (Michael Corda, Jack Wilson) - 2:38

Personnel 

 Nancy Wilson - vocals
 Oliver Nelson - arranger, conductor
 Eddie "Lockjaw" Davis - tenor saxophone
 Buster Williams - bass
 Shelly Manne - drums
 Larry Bunker - percussion
 David Cavanaugh - producer

References

1968 albums
Nancy Wilson (jazz singer) albums
Albums arranged by Oliver Nelson
Albums produced by Dave Cavanaugh
Capitol Records albums